Steen Tower Airport  was located near Steen Tower, Alberta, Canada.

References

Defunct airports in Alberta
Mackenzie County